The Württemberg regional football team is the amateur association football team representing Württemberg, Germany. The team competes in the German Football Association's annual U21 Länderpokal under the auspices of the Württemberg Football Association. The team has also been Germany's representative in the UEFA Regions' Cup four times.

Players

Current squad 
The following players were selected for the 2015 UEFA Regions' Cup.

Honours

UEFA Regions’ Cup
Bronze: 2003 (1)

Länderpokal
Winner: 1979, 1988, 2001, 2009 (4)
Runner-up: 2005, 2010, 2014, 2015, 2019  (5)

UEFA Regions' Cup

2003

Preliminary round

Final tournament

2011

Intermediary round

Final tournament

2013

Intermediary round

2015

Intermediary round

Final tournament

References

Football in Germany
Football in Baden-Württemberg
UEFA Regions' Cup
Amateur association football